Caïman de Douala are a football (soccer) club based in Douala, Cameroon. After some years of absence the team finally returned to the Cameroon Premiere Division in 2007. They were relegated in the 2008–09 season of the Elite One but once again earned promotion back to the top-division after topping the Elite Two league in the 2009–10 season.

Achievements
Cameroon Premiere Division: 3
 1962, 1968, 1975
Cameroon Championnat Territorial: 7 (Before independence)
 1937, 1941, 1943, 1948, 1949, 1950, 1951, 1955
Cameroon Cup: 4 (Before independence)
 1941, 1942, 1943, 1959

Performance in CAF competitions
CAF Cup Winners' Cup: 1 appearance
1978 – Quarter-Finals

References

Football clubs in Cameroon
1927 establishments in French Cameroon
Sports clubs in Cameroon